Georg Wollmann (born 1861) was a German trade union leader.

Wollmann became a ceramic worker and joined the Union of Porcelain and Related Workers of Germany.  In 1893, he was elected as president of the union.  From 1913, he additionally served as general secretary of the International Federation of Pottery Workers.  In 1926, he merged the union into the Factory Workers' Union of Germany, and became a leading figure in its Ceramic Federation.

References

1861 births
Year of death missing
German trade unionists